Lars Guenther (born November 13, 1994) is a German footballer who currently plays for FC Neu-Anspach.

Career

Guenther made his 3. Liga debut for SV Wehen Wiesbaden in August 2012, as a substitute for Daniel Döringer in a 2–2 draw with SV Babelsberg 03. He joined Eintracht Trier on loan in July 2013.

External links

1994 births
Living people
German footballers
SV Wehen Wiesbaden players
SV Eintracht Trier 05 players
3. Liga players
Association football midfielders
People from Bad Homburg vor der Höhe
Sportspeople from Darmstadt (region)
Footballers from Hesse